Swing, Sister, Swing is a 1938 American comedy film directed by Joseph Santley and written by Charles Grayson. The film stars Ken Murray, Johnny Downs, Kathryn Kane, Eddie Quillan, Ernest Truex and Edna Sedgewick. The film was released on December 16, 1938, by Universal Pictures.

Plot
Press agent Nap Sisler joins up with Snookie Saunders and Satchel Lips Peters to make a new dance "The Baltimore Bubble" a national hit.

Cast        
Ken Murray as Nap Sisler
Johnny Downs as Johnny Bennett
Kathryn Kane as Snookie Saunders
Eddie Quillan as Chick 'Satchel Lips' Peters
Ernest Truex as Prof. L. Orlando Beebee
Edna Sedgewick as Nona Tremayne
Nana Bryant as Hyacinth Hepburn
Esther Howard as Miss Fredericks
Clara Blandick as Ma Sisler
James Flavin as Pilot 
Emmett Vogan as Les Murphy 
Ted Weems as himself
Herbert Heywood as Mr. Beagle
Fred Santley as Photographer
John Ward as Nate Raymond
Alan Davis as Jack Stafford
John Hiestand as Radio Announcer
Clara Blore as Dancer
Eddie Fetherston as Photographer
Lloyd Ingraham as Station Agent
Alice Weaver as Dancer
Joe Niemeyer as Dance Instructor

References

External links
 

1938 films
1930s English-language films
American comedy films
1938 comedy films
Universal Pictures films
Films directed by Joseph Santley
American black-and-white films
1930s American films